Ellen Kathryn Longmire is an American applied physicist and mechanical engineer known for her research in experimental fluid dynamics and turbulence. She is a professor of aerospace engineering and mechanics at the University of Minnesota, where she is also Associate Dean for Academic Affairs in the College of Science & Engineering,, the former chair of the American Physical Society Division of Fluid Dynamics, and one of three editors-in-chief of the journal Experiments in Fluids.

Education and career
Longmire majored in physics at Princeton University, graduating in 1982. After a year at the Technical University of Braunschweig, and work in industry at Honeywell, Hauni-Werke Koerber, and Science Applications International, she went to Stanford University for graduate study in mechanical engineering, earning a master's degree in 1985 and completing a Ph.D. in 1990.

She became an assistant professor in the University of Minnesota Department of Aerospace Engineering and Mechanics in 1990, and was named McKnight Land-Grant Assistant Professor in 1994. She was promoted to a full professorship in 2003, and associate dean in 2018.

She chaired the American Physical Society Division of Fluid Dynamics in 2016.

Recognition
Longmire was named a Fellow of the American Physical Society (APS) in 2006, after a nomination by the APS Division of Fluid Dynamics, "for innovative experiments in turbulent and particle-laden flows, and the development of new and improved flow diagnostic techniques".

References

External links

Year of birth missing (living people)
Living people
American physicists
American women physicists
American mechanical engineers
American women engineers
Princeton University alumni
Stanford University alumni
University of Minnesota faculty
Fellows of the American Physical Society
American women academics
21st-century American women